César David Abaroa Pérez (born 18 November 1996) is a Chilean rower. He competed in the 2020 Summer Olympics.

References

External links 
 

1996 births
Living people
Sportspeople from Concepción, Chile
Sportspeople from Valparaíso
Rowers at the 2020 Summer Olympics
Chilean male rowers
Olympic rowers of Chile
Rowers at the 2014 Summer Youth Olympics
Pan American Games medalists in rowing
Rowers at the 2019 Pan American Games
Medalists at the 2019 Pan American Games
Pan American Games silver medalists for Chile
Pan American Games bronze medalists for Chile
21st-century Chilean people